Signalberg may refer to:

Germany
 Bastorfer Signalberg, a hill in the Kühlung hills of Mecklenburg-Vorpommern
 Signalberg (Damme), a hill in the Damme Hills of Lower Saxony
 Signalberg, a hill in the Upper Palatine Forest of Bavaria

Other places
 Signalberg, a hill near Neman, Kaliningrad Oblast, Russia
 Signalberg or Diedrichsberg, a hill in the borough of Qingdao, Shandong Province, China
 Montseny Massif (from the Latin: Monte Signum − "Signal Hill"), range in Catalonia, Spain
 Signal Hill (Cape Town), a hill near Cape Town, South Africa

See also
 Signal Hill (disambiguation)
 Signal Mountain (disambiguation)